Alireza Chay (also Romanized as Alīreẕā Chāy; also known as ‘Alīreẕā Chā'ī) is a village in Azghan Rural District, in the Central District of Ahar County, East Azerbaijan Province, Iran. At the 2006 census, its population was 269, in 41 families.

References 

Populated places in Ahar County